Mary Jackson may refer to:

People
 Mary Jackson (Richmond bread riot), organizer the of the 1863 Richmond bread riots in Civil War Richmond, Virginia, in the Confederate States
 Mary Jackson (actress) (1910–2005), an American television character actress
 Mary Jackson (engineer) (1921–2005), an American mathematician and aerospace engineer at NASA
 Mary Jackson (artist) (born 1945), an American fiber artist from South Carolina
 Mary M. Jackson (born 1966), a United States Navy officer
 Mary Jackson McCrorey (1867–1944), born Mary C. Jackson, American educator and mission worker

Fictional characters
Mary Jackson (Coronation Street), a character in Coronation Street
Mary Jackson, a character in the Stephen King novels The Regulators and Desperation

Other uses
Mary Jackson School, a senior high school in Keg River, Alberta, Canada
Mary W. Jackson Building, the official name of NASA Headquarters in Washington, D.C., in the United States

See also

 Jackson (disambiguation)
 Mary (disambiguation)
 

Jackson, Mary